Simojoki is a river of Finland in the region of Lapland. It flows for  into the Bothnian Bay at Simo.

See also
List of rivers in Finland

External links

 
Rivers of Finland